Shelly M. Shelton is an American businesswoman and politician. She served as a Republican member of the Nevada Assembly and ended her term at the end of 2016.

Early life
Shelly M. Shelton was born in Worthington, Minnesota. She graduated from Spencer School of Business, at the current  Buena Vista University, where she studied business. After college, she volunteered for two years in Russia and Romania with Adventures in Mission.

Career
Shelton started her career by working for Citibank in Sioux Falls, South Dakota; she was transferred to their Las Vegas office in 1997. With her husband, she co-started drycleaning and car registration businesses. In 2003 she co-founded Sonitx, an air filter and coil cleaning business, and remained active in that business  until 2021. Shelton is currently the sole owner of Sonitx National, a nationwide HVAC sustainability and water conservation consulting and training firm.

Shelton served as a Republican member of the Nevada Assembly.

Personal life
With her husband Tony, Shelton has three children. They reside in Las Vegas, Nevada.

References

Living people
People from Worthington, Minnesota
Politicians from Las Vegas
Buena Vista University alumni
Businesspeople from Las Vegas
Republican Party members of the Nevada Assembly
21st-century American politicians
21st-century American women politicians
Women state legislators in Nevada
21st-century American businesspeople
Businesspeople from Minnesota
Year of birth missing (living people)